Christopher Robert Dingman (born July 6, 1976) is a Canadian former professional ice hockey player. He played in the National Hockey League with the Calgary Flames, Colorado Avalanche, Carolina Hurricanes and the Tampa Bay Lightning.

Playing career
Dingman played junior hockey for the Brandon Wheat Kings of the Western Hockey League, and served as that team's captain when they won the WHL Championship during the 1995–96 season.  In his best campaign (1994–95) he scored 40 goals and totalled 83 points in 66 games, while also amassing 201 minutes in penalties, making him a multiple threat.

Dingman, or "Dinger" as he is known colloquially, was drafted by the Calgary Flames of the National Hockey League (19th overall in the 1994 NHL Entry Draft), and played his first full NHL season for the Flames in 1997–98, where he earned a reputation as a tough customer and found himself involved as a checker and a pugilist as opposed to a scoring line player.

During the 1998–99 season, he was included in the Theoren Fleury trade to the Colorado Avalanche in a multiplayer swap that saw him trade places with fellow combatant and old nemesis from the WHL, Wade Belak. Dingman plied his trade with the Avalanche for three seasons and won a Stanley Cup.

After winning a Stanley Cup, he ended up with the Carolina Hurricanes.

He was then dealt to the Tampa Bay Lightning in 2002.  While he saw only limited action in his first campaign there, he gradually earned more and more ice time and in 2004, Dingman won another Stanley Cup with the Lightning.

He was scratched for the last two Lightning/Senators games of the 2006 Stanley Cup Playoffs after earning a seven-minute Ottawa powerplay after challenging Chris Neil, but Neil turtled when Dingman started punching him, leading to a fighting, instigator, and game misconduct penalties.  Dingman never played again in the NHL.

Dingman totaled 120 fights in his NHL career.  His most notable was his beatdown of Bryce Salvador in November, 2000.  At one point in the fight, both Dingman and Salvador had their right fists cocked, squared up, and simultaneously threw a punch.  Salvador's punch missed while Dingman's punch connected with Salvador's jaw and sent Salvador's mouthpiece flying out of his mouth. Salvador crumpled to the ice, proving to be one of the most dynamic victories of Dingman's career.

In November 2006 he was acquired by Södertälje SK, in Sweden. He played 2007 for AaB Ishockey of the Oddset Ligaen in Denmark.

Dingman performed as a color commentator for the Tampa Bay Lightning on the Sun Sports network. During the 2016 season, he wasn't expected to return in that role.

Career statistics

Awards and honors

References

External links

1976 births
Living people
Brandon Wheat Kings players
Calgary Flames draft picks
Calgary Flames players
Canadian ice hockey left wingers
Carolina Hurricanes players
Colorado Avalanche players
Hershey Bears players
Ice hockey people from Edmonton
National Hockey League first-round draft picks
Saint John Flames players
Södertälje SK players
Springfield Falcons players
Stanley Cup champions
Tampa Bay Lightning announcers
Tampa Bay Lightning players
Canadian expatriate ice hockey players in Sweden